Oxya (Greek: Οξυά) is a mountain village in the western part of the Karditsa regional unit, Greece.  Oxya is in the municipality of Mouzaki. The village Oxya had a population of 112 in 2011, the community 368.  Oxya is located about 40 km west of Karditsa and is in the foot of the Pindus mountains.  Its residents are based in agriculture.

Population

After World War II and the Greek Civil War, the population steadily declined due to emigration.

External links
 Oxya on GTP Travel Pages

See also

List of settlements in the Karditsa regional unit

References

Populated places in Karditsa (regional unit)